Harvey Willson Harkness (May 25, 1821 – July 10, 1901) was an American mycologist and natural historian best known for his early descriptions of California fungal species.

Born and raised in Massachusetts and trained as a physician, Harkness came to California during the Gold Rush in 1849. He first set up a medical practice in the mining camp at Bidwell's Bar but moved to Sacramento in 1851. He rose to prominence as physician, educator, real estate developer, and newspaper editor in Sacramento, becoming part of the social circle of early California notables such as Leland Stanford, Charles Crocker, Collis Huntington, and Mark Hopkins. His active interest in school education led to his election as the first president of the Sacramento board of education in 1853. Harkness was a participant in the ceremony in May 1869 that marked the completion of the First transcontinental railroad, representing California and bearing the Golden Spike that was driven in by Leland Stanford marking the completion of the railroad.

Having earned a large fortune in Sacramento real estate, Harkness retired from his medical practice in 1869 and relocated to San Francisco. There, he was elected a member of the California Academy of Sciences in 1871, becoming vice president in 1878 and its president from 1887 to 1896. He became the Academy's curator of fungi in 1896.

He devoted himself to research into the natural history of the Pacific States, publishing articles on the age of the Lassen Cinder Cone and the nature of the fossil footprints discovered near Carson City, Nevada. He also travelled, visiting North Africa, Europe and the eastern USA several times. In November 1869 he was a guest at the opening of the Suez canal in Egypt.

The bulk of his research was devoted to cataloging the previously undescribed fungi of California. In the last 30 years of his life, Harkness authored or coauthored a number of papers and books on California fungi (especially truffles), ranging from simple species lists to a detailed monograph of California hypogeous fungi. These included the important early work co-authored with Justin P. Moore in 1880, Catalogue of the Pacific Coast Fungi (published by the California Academy of Sciences). The catalogue was first read on February 2, 1880 at a meeting of the California Academy of Sciences and later published in a 46-page pamphlet describing nearly 900 species with localities and habitats indicated for most of the species. He collected, exchanged or purchased over 10,000 specimens of fungi that were donated to the California Academy of Sciences in 1891. The collection contained many type specimens.


Personal life
Harkness's parents originated from Scotland and the family lived in Pelham, Massachusetts. He was their seventh child and the only one who survived into adulthood. He studied at the Berkshire Medical College in Massachusetts, graduating in 1847. He left Massachusetts for California in 1849 for his health as well as the potential of the Californian gold rush and joined with a group of emigrants at Rock Island, Illinois to travel there.  He married Amelia Griswold in 1854. She died within a year of the marriage.

Legacy 
Harkness and his correspondents described scores of fungal species that were new to science. His 1899 monograph, California Hypogeous Fungi, alone described some 55 new species of hypogeous fungi.
The phytopathogenic ascomycete genus Harknessia M.C. Cooke and the monotypic genus Harknessiella purpurea P.A. Saccardo are named for him, as are the names of fungal species in 20 genera, as well as several species of vascular plants, including Leptosiphon harknessii.
Mount Harkness, a mountain near Lassen Peak, is named for him.
There is an H. W. Harkness Elementary School in Sacramento, California, commemorating his role as first Superintendent of Schools for Sacramento.
Harkness Street in Sacramento, between 17th and 18th Streets, lies within the 90 acres of land on the southwest corner of what is now Broadway Ave. and Freeport Blvd. that Harkness owned.

References

External links

"MycoDigest: Pioneers of California Mycology: HW Harkness" by Peter Werner, Mycena News 57(12):1,4,6, December 2006.
"The Society's Founders" by Irma West, Sierra Sacramento Valley Medicine 55(2), March/April 2004. (Scroll down to "Harvey W. Harkness, MD, 1821–1901".)

19th-century American botanists
American mycologists
1821 births
1901 deaths
People associated with the California Academy of Sciences
People from Pelham, Massachusetts
Scientists from California
Botanists with author abbreviations
Writers from San Francisco
Stanford University trustees